In My Lifetime may refer to:

 "In My Lifetime" (song), a 1995 single by Jay-Z
 In My Lifetime, Vol. 1, a 1997 album by Jay-Z
 In My Lifetime, a 1996 album by Neil Diamond